The Callahans and the Murphys is a 1927 American silent comedy film directed by George W. Hill.  The film was based on a novel by Kathleen Norris, and was the first of several MGM films to star Marie Dressler and Polly Moran.

The film was released on June 18, 1927, but subsequently withdrawn from distribution by MGM after protests were lodged by Irish-American organizations. The film is now presumed to be a lost film.

Plot
Mrs. Callahan (Dressler) and Mrs. Murphy (Moran), are a couple of feuding tenement housewives working to keep control of their many children.  Dan Murphy (Gray) falls in love with Ellen Callahan (O'Neill), and then later disappears after Ellen is pregnant. Mrs. Callahan (Dressler) decides to adopt the baby to save her daughters reputation, but later finds out that the baby is not illegitimate after all.

Cast
 Marie Dressler as Mrs. Callahan
 Polly Moran as Mrs. Murphy
 Sally O'Neil as Ellen Callahan
 Lawrence Gray as Dan Murphy
 Eddie Gribbon as Jim Callahan
 Frank Currier as Grandpa Callahan
 Gertrude Olmstead as Monica Murphy
 Turner Savage as Timmy Callahan
 Jackie Combs as Terrance Callahan
 Anne Shirley as Mary Callahan (as Dawn O'Day)
 Monty O'Grady as Michael Callahan
 Tom Lewis as Mr. Murphy

See also
List of lost films

References

External links
 
 
 The Callahans and the Murphys at SilentEra
 AllMovie.com

1927 films
1927 comedy films
1927 lost films
Silent American comedy films
American silent feature films
American black-and-white films
1920s English-language films
Films directed by George Hill
Lost American films
Lost comedy films
Metro-Goldwyn-Mayer films
Films based on American novels
1920s American films